Ron Holliday (born February 12, 1948) is a former NFL football player with the San Diego Chargers during the 1970s, as a wide receiver. He played 11 games with the Chargers during the 1973 NFL season.

External links

Pittsburgh Panthers football players
San Diego Chargers players
Philadelphia Bell players
Living people
1948 births
People from West Chester, Pennsylvania
American football wide receivers
Atlantic Coast Football League players